Doruk may refer to:

 Doruk (name)
 Doruk, Iran
 Doruk.net
 Doruk, Bismil